Noyan Öz (born 13 September 1991) is a Turkish-German footballer who plays as a forward for Turkish TFF Third League club Turgutluspor.

Career
Öz began his career with Kickers Offenbach, and scored frequently for the reserve team in the 2010–11 season, earning a first-team debut in the 3. Liga at the end of the season, when he replaced Sead Mehic in a 3–2 defeat to Dynamo Dresden. In July 2011 he left Offenbach to sign for FSV Frankfurt II, and a year later he moved on to Eintracht Frankfurt II. He scored nine goals in the 2012–13 season: unusually, this total consisted of three hattricks, and no other goals. In July 2013 he moved to Turkey to sign for Elazığspor.

Club

External links

1991 births
Footballers from Frankfurt
German people of Turkish descent
Living people
German footballers
Turkish footballers
Association football wingers
Association football forwards
Kickers Offenbach players
FSV Frankfurt players
Eintracht Frankfurt II players
Elazığspor footballers
Boluspor footballers
Gençlerbirliği S.K. footballers
Hacettepe S.K. footballers
Tokatspor footballers
Utaş Uşakspor footballers
Turgutluspor footballers
Oberliga (football) players
3. Liga players
Regionalliga players
Süper Lig players
TFF First League players
TFF Second League players
TFF Third League players